The Sabadell Financial Center is an office building in Downtown Miami, Florida, United States. It is located in the northern Brickell Financial District of Miami, on Brickell Avenue and Southeast 12th Street. Built in 2000, the building is over 95% office space, with the ground floor dedicated to retail. 

See also 
List of tallest buildings in Miami

External links 
Sabadell Financial Center on Emporis
Photo of the Sabadell Financial Center, courtesy of Emporis

Office buildings completed in 2000
Skyscraper office buildings in Miami
2000 establishments in Florida